The 5th Guards Rifle Division was an infantry division of the Red Army in World War II. It fought at Kaluga, Orel, Moscow, Bryansk, Gorodok, and in Belorussia, East Prussia, and Kurland.

On September 26, 1941 for their courage, bravery and heroism displayed in the Yelnya Offensive by order of State Defence Committee (NKO) number 318 of 09/26/1941, the 107th Rifle Division was transformed into the 5th Guards Rifle Division. The division was withdrawn to re-form in the reserve of the Western Front in the area of Vyshny Volochyok.

The division was part of the "operational army" in the following periods: 26/09/1941 - 22/04/1944, 28/05/1944 - 09/05/1945.

In the fall of 1941 and winter of 1941-1942's as part of 49th Army Western Front, the division participated in the defensive battles near Moscow. The division successfully acted in the course of the Moscow counter-offensive and the subsequent general offensive of Soviet troops.

On October 4, 1941 in the region of Mtsensk and, in the area of Bryansk Front, a Stavka order hastily concentrated reserve units, from which was formed 1st Guards Rifle Corps, which the division joined. However, due to the worsening of the situation on the Western Front, the same day the division was reassigned to the 49th Army and its trains directed via Gorbachev to Sukhinichi. In October 5 Division began to advance to the Medyn to attack in the Yukhnov as well. In early October, the heroic actions of the division as it aimed to help the 49th Army confirmed the validity of the assignment of the division's Guards title.

By 1 November 1941, the division was with 49th Army, alongside 7th Guards Rifle Division and 60th Rifle Division.

With 11th Guards Army of the 3rd Belorussian Front May 1945. Became 5th Guards Motor Rifle Division in 1957 (Military Unit Number 08618); disbanded in 1959 at Gvardeysk. Final honorifics were 'Gorodokskaya order of Lenin Red Banner order of Suvorov.'

References

G005
Military units and formations established in 1941
Military units and formations disestablished in 1957